Charles F. Brush High School is a public high school in Lyndhurst, Ohio. The school is named for Charles F. Brush, the Ohio-born inventor of the arc light.

Brush has 1,334 students as of the 2017–2018 school year. The school, which is situated close to the border with neighboring South Euclid, serves as the sole high school in the South Euclid–Lyndhurst City School District.

School history
In 1912, prior to the construction of Brush High School, students attended South Euclid School House at the corner of Mayfield & Green Roads. The first class graduated in 1916.
Brush High School opened in 1927, providing students in South Euclid and Lyndhurst with a centralized high school.

In 1961, Korb Field became the brightest nighttime football field in the country as General Electric engineers from Nela Park installed experimental mercury floodlights.
In 1962 the B wing and John C. Welser Gymnasium were added, giving the school a new library and gym.
In 1974 the C wing, which houses mostly the art and business departments, and the D wing, housing a new cafeteria and the science and math departments were added.
In 2002 artificial turf was installed in Korb Field.
2008 – Former First Lady and 2008 Presidential Candidate Hillary Clinton visited Brush High School for a February 15 rally.

Sports
The Brush campus is home to eight tennis courts, a turfed multipurpose athletic field for football and soccer, a track, and a softball field. The Arcs baseball team uses the facilities at Greenview Upper Elementary School, the swim team uses the pools at Euclid High School, and the hockey team uses the Cleveland Heights Recreation Center ice rink as their home rink.

Notable alumni

 Pharaoh Brown, professional football player in the National Football League (NFL) 
 Eric Carmen, singer-songwriter and lead singer of The Raspberries.
 Sharon Creech, author
 Cathi Forbes, Maryland legislator
 Alexander Gelman, theater director
 Stephen Hadley, National Security Advisor under the Bush Administration.
 Roy Hall, professional football player in the NFL
 Carter Ham, General (US Army, retired), former Commanding General, U.S. Africa Command
 Ken Landenberger, professional baseball player in Major League Baseball (MLB)
 Jim Laughlin, professional football player in the NFL
 Les Levine, Cleveland sportscaster, radio host and newspaper columnist 
 Dan Masteller, professional baseball player in MLB
 Jason Pryor, Olympic Men's Épée Fencer
 Lucie Salhany, entertainment executive, former chairman of Fox Broadcasting Company
 Rick Smith Jr. (born 1981) professional illusionist and card thrower.
 Steve Stone (born 1947), professional baseball player in MLB, named an All-Star and Cy Young Award winner; TV color commentator 
 Dave Tobik, professional baseball player in MLB
 Carl Walz, NASA astronaut.
 Jiggs Whigham, first jazz instructor in Europe, jazz trombone player

Notes and references

High schools in Cuyahoga County, Ohio
Educational institutions established in 1927
Public high schools in Ohio
Alternative schools in the United States
1927 establishments in Ohio